Let It Come Down is the fourth studio album by the rock band Spiritualized, released in 2001. It was recorded and produced at Abbey Road and AIR Studios. It took Jason Pierce, Spiritualized's lead singer, guitarist and sole constant member, four years to write, perform, produce and release. The album utilises 115 session musicians, including orchestra and London Community Gospel Choir. The wall of sound technique (most notably used by 1960s record producer Phil Spector) is evident on this album, especially on such tracks as "Do It All Over Again", "Stop Your Crying", "The Straight and the Narrow" and "Out of Sight".

Music
The album's sound is described as art rock, symphonic rock, and space rock.

Album cover
The album was released in two different sleeves – one in a standard jewel case, the other in a much bulkier one-piece box, with the cover image (the wife of the artist) debossed in the case material.

Track listing
All songs written by J Spaceman.

Reception

Q listed Let It Come Down as one of the best 50 albums of 2001.

Commercial performance
Let It Come Down is the band's most successful album on the UK Albums Chart, where it peaked at number three. As of 2005 it has sold 55,000 copies in United States, and as of 2003 it has shipped 250,000 units across Europe.

Personnel
Spiritualized
 Spaceman – Fender Thinline, Fender Jaguar, Epiphone Olympic, Vox Starstreamer XII, Martin acoustic, banjo, Vox Continental, Farfisa Compact, piano, harmonica, vocals
 Thighpaulsandra – Hammond C3, Vox Continental, Farfisa Compact, VK7, Kurzweil K2000, Minimoog, Fender Rhodes, piano
 Doggen Foster – Gibson Les Paul Gold Top, Gibson Les Paul Custom, Fender Telecaster, Vox Bulldog, Martin acoustic, harmonica
 John Coxon – Fender Telecaster, Fender Jaguar, Gibson Firebird, Vox Continental, Farfisa Compact, piano, Juno 106, Martin acoustic
 Martin Schellard – Fender Jazz Bass, Fender Musicmaster, Fender Bass VI, Burns Bass, Fender Telecaster, banjo, piano
 Tom Edwards – vibraphone, marimba, timpani, tubular bells, percussion
 Kevin Bales – Gretsch drum kit
 Raymond Dickaty – soprano and baritone saxophone

Additional musicians

 Pete Whyman – saxophones, clarinet
 Mimi Parker – vocals
 Chris Clark – piano
 David O'Carroll – tuba
 Ben Edwards – trumpet
 Nick Smart – trumpet
 James Adams – trombone
 Tamar Osborn – saxophone, clarinet
 David Temple – saxophone, clarinet
 First Violins: Edmund Coxon (leader), Cathy Thompson, Jackie Shave, Everton Nelson, Patrick Kiernan, Steve Morris, Ian Humphries, Christina Emanuel, Laura Malhuish
 Second Violins: Jonathan Rees, Dai Emanuel, Sonia Slaney, Perry Montague-Mason, Miffy Hirsch, Jeremy Morris, Ann Morfee
 Viola: Roger Chase, Philip Dukes, Bruce White, Kate Musker
 Cello: David Daniels, Tony Pleeth, Cathy Giles, Jonathan Tunnell
 Double Bass: Mary Scully, Diane Clarke
 Cor Anglais: Jane Marshall
 Bassoon: Gavin McNaughton, Celia Birkenshaw
 French Horn: Hugh Seenan, Richard Bissel, Nigel Black, Paul Gardham, Dave Lee, Martin Owen, Richard Ashton, Michaela Betts
 Trumpet: Andy Crowley, Ian Balmain, Bob Farley, Paul Archibald, Paul Beniston
 Trombone: Graham Lee, Colin Sheen, Peter Davies, Mike Hext, Roger Brenner
 Bass Trombone: David Stewart, Roger Argente, Andy Waddicor
 Flute/Alto flute and Bass flute: Dave Health, Andy Findon
 Contra-bass flute: Andy Findon
 Oboe: Chris Cowie, Margaret Tindal
 Clarinet: Anthony Pike, Richard Addison
 Bass Clarinet: David Fuest
 Harp: Helen Tunstall

Additional vocals

 Nigel Short – counter tenor
 Emer McParland – alto
 Sarah Eyden – soprano
 Simon Grant – bass
 Andrew Busher – tenor
 Michael Dore – bass
 Heather Cairncross – alto
 Andrew Gray – tenor
 Jacqueline Barron – soprano
 Rachel Weston – alto
 Gerard O'Beirne – tenor
 London Community Gospel Choir: Wendi Rose, Wayne Hernandez, Jenny Graham, Donovan Keith Lawrence, Vernetta Meade, Jenny La Touche, Aaron Paul Sokell, Travis Jae Cole, Vimbai Shire, Samantha Smith, Irene Forrester, Carmen Smart, Michelle John-Douglas, Jasette Barratt
 Choir Director: Daniel Thomas

References

2001 albums
Spiritualized albums
Arista Records albums
Art rock albums by English artists
Symphonic rock albums